Benjamin Danielsson Roth (German: Roht) was a Saxon blacksmith and farrier who emigrated to Sweden near the beginning of the 18th century. He is best known for his work on Charles XII's Stair at Katarina Church in Stockholm, Sweden.

Emigration to Sweden
Roth family legend had long speculated that Benjamin was either hired or conscripted to serve as a blacksmith for the army of Charles XII of Sweden when it marched north from Saxony to invade the Russian Empire and that he returned to Sweden with other surviving members of the Swedish army after their defeat by Peter the Great. This narrative conflicts with records of his marriage to a Swedish woman in 1704 and the fact that Saxony was not defeated and subsequently allied with Sweden until 1706. Also, records indicate that the few Swedish soldiers that were not either killed or captured in Russia fled south with Charles XII and did not return with him to Sweden until 1715. This means that either:

A. Benjamin's emigration to Sweden happened sometime before 1704 and was unrelated to Saxony's alliance with Sweden or;

B. The records that indicate a marriage date of 1704 are incorrect. Their first child was born in August 1707 so an actual marriage date of sometime in 1706 is possible.

Life in Sweden
Benjamin settled in the part of Stockholm called Södermalm where he worked as a master farrier. He married Catharina Berg, the daughter of Swedish locksmith Lars Olsson Berg, in 1704. They had 7 children: Maria, Catharina, Carl, Benjamin, Christina Charlotta, and Margareta and one unnamed child who died either in birth or infancy.

In addition to their home in Södermalm, an estate inventory in 1763 indicates that they owned two small stone houses between Baggensgatan and Västerlånggatan in Gamla Stan (Old Town), Stockholm. Benjamin was a member of the German parish and eventually became an alderman in Stockholm's farriers guild.

Roht vs. Roth
None of the sources relating to Benjamin Roth or his son Carl speak to or explain the alternate spelling of Roth found on Karl XII's stair. It may be due to that in the past names had different spellings in different languages. (I.E. Karl in Germany, Karl or Carl in Sweden, Charles in England, Char in France, Carolos in Latin, etc.) It may simply have been spelled Roht in Saxony and Roth in Sweden, and the family eventually formally adopted the Swedish spelling.

Benjamin's Admiration for Charles XII of Sweden

Karl XII:s Trappa

Sometime between 1712 and 1715 Benjamin was commissioned to forge a railing for a staircase at Katarina Church in Södermalm.  The stair was dedicated to Charles XII of Sweden and his royal monogram appears above the dedication date. He is also mentioned in the poem that is engraved on the pillars on either side of the stair. This double staircase leads from the cemetery up to the southern entrance of the church. It was dedicated in 1715 and he was paid 300 riksdaler for the work. The railing was renovated by Benjamin's son, Carl Roth, in 1776.

Tradition of Carl

Benjamin named his first son Carl in honor of the king of Sweden, Charles XII. This began a tradition in House Roth where some or all of the male children (usually at least the oldest) were named Carl and were commonly known by their middle names. This tradition has persisted within certain branches of House Roth for over 300 years to present day: The youngest being Carl Eben Roth, son of Carl Jan Christian and Stephanie Roth, born 2019.

References

Sources
 Kristoffer Huldt, Översikt av Släkten Roth (Overview of House Roth)
 Handlingar Rörande Släkten Roth (Documents Relating to House Roth) National Library of Sweden SE S-HS Acc2008/80
 Svenskt Biografiskt Lexicon (Swedish Biographical Lexicon)
 Svenska Ättartal (Swedish Genealogical Reference Book) 1822, Page 447, Note 3

Year of birth missing
1737 deaths
German blacksmiths
Farriers
German emigrants to Sweden